This is a list of football transfers in the July–August (winter) transfer window of the 2010–11 season of the Argentine Primera División.

Clubs are ordered according to their final standing in the 2010 Clausura tournament. Only expatriate clubs are identified with national flags.

Argentinos Juniors

In:

Out:

Estudiantes de La Plata

In:

Out:

Godoy Cruz

In:

Out:

Independiente

In:

Out:

Banfield

In:

Out:

Newell's Old Boys

In:

Out:

Lanús

In:

Out:

Racing

In:

Out:

Vélez Sársfield

In:

Out:

Huracán

In:

Out:

Tigre

In:

Out:

Gimnasia y Esgrima La Plata

In:

Out:

River Plate

In:

Out:

Colón

In:

Out:

San Lorenzo

In:

Out:

Boca Juniors

In:

Out:

Arsenal

In:

Out:

Olimpo

In:

Out:

Quilmes

In:

Out:

All Boys

In:

Out:

References
Opening '10 - Transfers at ArgentineSoccer.com
Mercado de pases at Olé 

Transfers
Football transfers summer 2010
2010